Prymorsk is a city in Zaporizhzhia Oblast, Ukraine. It serves as the administrative center of Prymorsk Raion. Population: .

History 
It was a settlement in Taurida Governorate of the Russian Empire.

Until 1964 the town was known as Nogaisk after the Turkic Nogai people who lived in the area until the nineteenth century.

City since 1967.

In 1974 the population was 11.9 thousand people.

In January 1989 the population was 13 965 people.

References

1800s establishments in Ukraine
Cities in Zaporizhzhia Oblast
Cities of district significance in Ukraine
Populated places established in 1800
Populated places established in the Russian Empire